This is a list of Canadian Stanley Cup Finals television announcers.

Play-by-play (English)

Color commentary (English)

Ice level reporter(s)

Studio host(s)

Studio analyst(s)

English-language networks
 CBC (-; -present)
 CTV (-)
 Global (-)

CBC's coverage of Games 3, 4 and 5 of the 1954 Stanley Cup Finals were joined in progress at 9:30 p.m. (approximately one hour after start time). Meanwhile, CBC joined Game 6 in at 10 p.m. (again, one hour after start time). Game 7 was carried Dominion wide (nationwide) from opening the face off at 9 p.m. Since Game 7 was played on Good Friday night, there were no commercials (Imperial Oil was the sponsor).

The 1961 Stanley Cup Finals were almost not televised in Canada at all. At that time, the CBC only had rights to the Montreal Canadiens and Toronto Maple Leafs' games; home games only during the season and all games in the playoffs. However, with both the Canadiens and Maple Leafs eliminated in the semi-finals, the CBC's worst nightmare became reality. The CBC had to conceive a way to carry the Finals between the Chicago Black Hawks-Detroit Red Wings or face public revolt. According to lore, the CBC found a way to link their Windsor viewers as having a vested interest in the Finals with the across the river Red Wings. Thus, CBC was able to carry the series after inking special contracts with the Red Wings and Black Hawks as a service to the Windsor market. From Windsor, CBC linked the signal to Toronto and they relayed the coverage Dominion-wide. From there, Canadians were able to see the Finals with nary a glitch in the coverage.

To accommodate the American TV coverage on NBC (1966 marked the first time that a Stanley Cup Finals game was to be nationally broadcast on American network television), Game 1 of the 1966 Stanley Cup Finals was shifted to a Sunday afternoon. This in return, was the first time ever that a National Hockey League game was played on a Sunday afternoon in Montreal. While Games 1 and 4 of the NBC broadcasts were televised in color, CBC carried these games and all other games in black and white.

The most commonly seen video clip of Bobby Orr's famous overtime goal ("The Flight") in Game 4 of the 1970 Stanley Cup Finals is the American version broadcast on CBS as called by Dan Kelly. This archival clip can be considered a rarity, since about 98% of the time, any surviving kinescopes or videotapes of the actual telecasts of hockey games from this era usually emanate from CBC's coverage. According to Dick Irvin Jr.'s book My 26 Stanley Cups (Irvin was in the CBC booth with Danny Gallivan during the 1970 Stanley Cup Finals), he was always curious why even the CBC prototypically uses the CBS replay of the Bobby Orr goal (with Dan Kelly's commentary) instead of Gallivan's call. The explanation that Irvin received was that the CBC's master tape of the game (along with others) was thrown away in order clear shelf space at the network.

In , Hockey Night in Canada moved all playoff coverage from CBC to CTV to avoid conflict with the lengthy NABET strike against the CBC. Eventually,  MacLaren Advertising, in conjunction with Molson Breweries and Imperial Oil/Esso, who actually owned the rights to Hockey Night in Canada (not CBC) decided to give the playoff telecast rights to CTV. Initially, it was on a game by game basis in the quarterfinals (Game 1 of the Boston-Toronto series was seen on CFTO Toronto in full while other CTV affiliates, but not all joined the game in progress. Game 1 of the New York Rangers–Montreal series was seen only on CFCF Montreal while Game 4 not televised due to a lockout of technicians at the Montreal Forum), and then the full semifinals and Stanley Cup Finals. Because CTV did not have 100% penetration in Canada at this time, they asked CBC (who ultimately refused) to allow whatever one of their affiliates were the sole network in that market to show the playoffs. As a result, the 1972 Stanley Cup playoffs were not seen in some of the smaller Canadian markets unless said markets were close enough to the United States border to pick up the signal of a CBS affiliate that carried Games, 1, 4, or 6 (Games 2, 3 and 5 were not nationally broadcast in the United States).

In 1980, Bob Cole, Dan Kelly and Jim Robson shared play-by-play duties for CBC's coverage. Cole did play-by-play for the first half of Games 1 and 2. Meanwhile, Kelly did play-by-play for the second half Games 1–5 (Kelly also did call the overtime period of Game 1). Finally, Robson did play-by-play for first half of Games 3 and 4 and Game 6 entirely. Except for Game 5, Kelly did play-by-play for the first period and first half Games 5, and Jim Robson play-by-play for the rest of Game 5. In essence this meant that Bob Cole or Jim Robson would do play-by-play for the first period and the first half of the second period. Therefore, at the closest stoppage of play near the 10 minute mark of the second period, Cole or Robson handed off the call to Kelly for the rest of the game.

In , CBC televised Games 1 and 2 nationally while Games 3–5 were televised in Edmonton only. CTV televised Games 3–5 nationally while games were blacked out in Edmonton. Dan Kelly, Ron Reusch, and Brad Park called the games on CTV. In , CBC only televised Games 1 and 2 in Montreal and Calgary. CBC televised Games 3–5 nationally. When CTV televised Games 1 and 2, both games were blacked out in Montreal and Calgary. Like in the year prior, Dan Kelly, Ron Reusch, and Brad Park called the games for CTV.

When CBC and Global televised Game 7 of the 1987 Stanley Cup Finals, they used separate production facilities and separate on-air talent.

Play-by-play (French)

Color commentary (French)

French-language networks
 RDS (–)
 SRC (–)
 TVA (–present)

References

CBC Sports
CTV Sports
TVA (Canadian TV network)
Lists of National Hockey League broadcasters